Dominique Thorne is an American actress. She appeared in the films If Beale Street Could Talk (2018) and Judas and the Black Messiah (2021). In 2022, she began playing Riri Williams / Ironheart with the Marvel Cinematic Universe feature film Black Panther: Wakanda Forever.

Early life 
Dominique Thorne was born November 8, 1997, in New York to parents Nerissa Guy and Navie Guy, who are Trinidadian immigrants. She has two brothers, Ky-Mani and Caleb.

Thorne attended Professional Performing Arts School in Manhattan (PPAS) where she studied dramatic theatre formally. During her senior year of high school, she won the 2015 Young Arts Award in Spoken Theater as well as the U.S. Presidential Scholar in the Arts, which is given annually by the White House. After applying to a number of universities for both academics and art programs, Thorne chose to attend Cornell University, where she was initiated into Mu Gamma chapter of Delta Sigma Theta sorority in Spring 2018. The following year, she received her bachelors degree in Human Development with a minor in Inequality Studies. Prior to graduating in May 2019,  she became a member of the Sphinx Head secret senior honors society. As of 2020, she and her family live in Delaware.

Career
In 2018 Thorne made her feature film debut as Shelia Hunt, the ill-tempered younger sister of main character Fonny Hunt, in the film If Beale Street Could Talk, which was based on James Baldwin's novel of the same name. In 2021 she played Judy Harmon, a member of the Black Panthers, in the film Judas and the Black Messiah.

In 2020, she was cast as the Marvel Comics superhero Riri Williams / Ironheart in the upcoming Marvel Cinematic Universe Disney+ television series Ironheart. She made her debut in that role in the 2022 feature film ''Black Panther: Wakanda Forever.

Filmography

Film

Television

References

External links
 

21st-century American actresses
Cornell University alumni
Living people
American film actresses
Actresses from New York City
American people of Trinidad and Tobago descent
African-American actresses
Year of birth missing (living people)